Great Mission New Neighborhood, Tricolor Neighborhood (Spanish: Gran Misión Barrio Nuevo, Barrio Tricolor, GMBNBT) is a programme of the Government of Venezuela Bolivarian missions to rehabilitate homes. It was launched by the Hugo Chávez administration on August 9, 2009.

Originally launched with the range of Mission, the Nicolás Maduro administration raised the status of the programme to Great Mission in 2013.

See also 

 Great Mission Housing Venezuela

References

External links 
 

Bolivarian missions